TDM Ou Mun (Chinese: 澳視澳門) owned by TDM - Teledifusão de Macau, S. A., is the first broadcasting channel in Macau. It is free-to-air, and in the Cantonese language. It is mainly focused on local news and informative programs such as "TDM News", "Macau Forum"and  "Financial Magazine" etc. Also, it includes local living programs such as "Our people, our life" etc.

See also
 TDM Macau
 Media of Macau

References

External links 
 http://www.tdm.com.mo/

Television in Macau
Television stations in China
Chinese-language television
Television channels and stations established in 1984
1984 establishments in Macau